Matias Møvik (born 16 May 1991) is a Norwegian footballer who currently plays for Fana IL.

He joined Fana from Løv-Ham ahead of the 2012 season.

References

1991 births
Living people
People from Hordaland
Norwegian footballers
Association football forwards
SK Brann players
Eliteserien players
Løv-Ham Fotball players
Fana IL players
Sportspeople from Vestland